Krížová Ves (Goral: Křizova Vješ) is a village and municipality in Kežmarok District in the Prešov Region of north Slovakia.

History
In historical records the village was first mentioned in 1290. Krížová Ves had been known also by its German name Kreuz.

Geography
The municipality lies at an altitude of 624 metres and covers an area of 11.928 km².
It has a population of about 2000 people.

Demographics
According to 2010 census total population was 2008. In the village is sizeable Roma nationality, which had been claimed by 1249 inhabitants, which is ca. 62% of the total population. In 2010 there had been 1008 males and 1000 females, what is ca. 50% for both.

Economy and infrastructure
In Krížová Ves are a football pitch, public library, elementary school, kindergarten, cable TV, foodstuff store and a general store. Cultural sightseeings are gothic Roman Catholic and evangelical churches and a Renaissance manor house.

References

External links
 
 
 https://www.e-obce.sk/obec/krizovaves/krizova-ves.html

Villages and municipalities in Kežmarok District
Romani communities in Slovakia